Pup Tent is the fourth album by the American alternative rock band Luna, released in 1997.

Background
"Bobby Peru" is named after an eccentric, overtly creepy character played by Willem Dafoe in the David Lynch film Wild at Heart. Wareham read the phrase "Fuzzy Wuzzy" in a Don DeLillo book. Wareham said that "The Creeps" isn't terribly good and probably should have been left off the album.

Track listing
All lyrics by Dean Wareham, music by Luna.

 "IHOP"  – 5:44
 "Beautiful View"  – 3:43
 "Pup Tent"  – 5:55
 "Bobby Peru"  – 3:43
 "Beggar's Bliss"  – 3:34
 "Tracy I Love You"  – 4:45
 "Whispers"  – 3:55
 "City Kitty"  – 5:44
 "The Creeps"  – 3:35
 "Fuzzy Wuzzy"  – 5:48

Personnel
Luna
 Dean Wareham – vocals, guitars
 Sean Eden – guitars
 Justin Harwood – bass, keyboards, trumpet, guitars
 Lee Wall – drums, percussion
with:
 Jamie Candeloro – Mandolin and slide dobro on "Beggar's Bliss"
 Barrett Martin – Marimba and vibraphone on "Pup Tent" and "Beautiful View''
 Pat McCarthy – "bits and bobs"
 Mike Russell – accordion on "City Kitty"
 Jane Scarpantoni – cello on "City Kitty"

Production
 Pat McCarthy – producer, engineer
 Mastered by Greg Calbi
 Jed Luhmann - assistant engineer

Notes

Luna (1990s American band) albums
1997 albums
Albums produced by Pat McCarthy (record producer)
Elektra Records albums